Agaricia is a genus of colonial stony corals in the family Agariciidae. These corals are found in shallow waters of the West Indies.

Characteristics
Corals in this genus have several different forms but are usually massive, leaf-like or plate-like. Members of the genus are distinguished from other corals by having no walls to the corallites but having clearly delineated septocostae that connect each corallite to its neighbours.

Species
The World Register of Marine Species recognises the following species:

Agaricia agaricites (Linnaeus, 1758)
Agaricia fragilis Dana, 1846
Agaricia grahamae Wells, 1973
Agaricia humilis Verrill, 1901
Agaricia lamarcki Milne Edwards & Haime, 1851
Agaricia tenuifolia Dana, 1846
Agaricia undata (Ellis & Solander, 1786)

References

Agariciidae
Taxa named by Jean-Baptiste Lamarck
Scleractinia genera